is a retired long-distance runner from Japan, whose personal best in the men's 10,000 metres was 28:29.29, achieved at the 1993 World Championships. He won the silver medal in the 10,000 m from the 1993 East Asian Games in Shanghai.

Achievements

References
 

Japanese male long-distance runners
1964 births
Living people
Place of birth missing (living people)
20th-century Japanese people